Trout River is a small rural fishing town located on the southern coastal edge of Gros Morne National Park in Newfoundland, near the Tablelands. Trout River was settled in 1815 by George Crocker and his family, who were its only inhabitants until 1880. The community is served by Route 431.

Trout River is less than 10 minutes from the Tableland Mountains, part of the UNESCO world heritage site Gros Morne National Park.

This town is known for its sunsets over the water and boardwalk. It has many small hiking trails to take in and one of Gros Morne's longest hiking trails, 14 km return, The Trout River Pond Trail.

There is a large natural tower of rock, a sea stack, just south of the town.

In 2014, a blue whale carcass washed up along the shore in Trout River which attracted international attention. The skeleton of this whale was later put on display at the Royal Ontario Museum.

There are many other attractions in the small town like the elephant head mountain, many hiking trails and a sea stack referred to as the old man.

Demographics 

See also
List of cities and towns in Newfoundland and Labrador

References

Populated coastal places in Canada
Towns in Newfoundland and Labrador
Fishing communities in Canada